Teri Kasam: (तेरी कसम) is a 1982 Indian Bollywood movie directed by A. C. Tirulokchandar and starring Kumar Gaurav, Poonam Dhillon, Girish Karnad, Ranjeeta and Nirupa Roy. It is a remake of the Tamil film Puguntha Veedu (1972).

Plot 
Dolly (Poonam Dhillon) has been brought up by her rich brother in the most lavish fashion. Tony (Kumar Gaurav) is from a poor family and studies in the same college as Dolly. He is in love with Dolly but is shy to admit it. Dolly however loves an unknown voice. When she learns that it is Tony's voice, she decides to marry him. But Tony refuses to marry unless his sister Shanti is married. So Dolly's brother marries Shanti. Dolly's arrogance creates tension in the lives of everyone. She disrespects Tony's mother and admits her to a general ward of a hospital. When Tony learns this, he is infuriated and leaves his wife and his job. He takes to singing as profession and becomes a famous singer. What follows is a tale of realization on Dolly's and Tony's part. It is all about rich-poor relations as shown in earlier films. And then humiliation which in turn causes the rise of a hero, as a successful singer.

Cast
 Kumar Gaurav as Tony
 Poonam Dhillon as Dolly
 Girish Karnad as Rakesh
 Ranjeeta as Shanti
 Nirupa Roy as Parvati 
 Paintal as Tony's Friend 
 Rakesh Bedi as Tony's Friend 
 Mushtaq Merchant as Tony's Friend 
 Manmauji as Tony's Friend 
 Birbal  as Hotel Manager

Soundtrack
All songs of the movie were sung by Amit Kumar (including a duet song with Lata Mangeshkar) and became very popular.

Awards

 30th Filmfare Awards:

Nominated

 Best Supporting Actor – Girish Karnad
 Best Supporting Actress – Ranjeeta Kaur
 Best Male Playback Singer – Amit Kumar for "Yeh Zameen Gaa Rahi Hai"

References

External links 
 
 Cult of Kumar

Hindi remakes of Tamil films
1982 films
1980s Hindi-language films
Films scored by R. D. Burman
Films directed by A. C. Tirulokchandar